The Ligne à Grande Vitesse Est européenne (East European High Speed Line), typically shortened to LGV Est, is a French high-speed rail line that connects Vaires-sur-Marne (near Paris) and Vendenheim (near Strasbourg). The line halved the travel time between Paris and Strasbourg and provides fast services between Paris and the principal cities of Eastern France as well as Luxembourg, Germany and Switzerland. The LGV Est is a segment of the Main Line for Europe project to connect Paris with Budapest with high-speed rail service.

The line was built in two phases. Construction on the  second phase from Baudrecourt to Vendenheim began in June 2010; the second phase opened to commercial service on 3 July 2016. Opening of the second phase was delayed after a train derailed near Eckwersheim during commissioning trials, resulting in 11 deaths.

A specially modified train performed a series of high-speed tests on the first phase of the LGV Est prior to its opening. In April 2007, it reached a top speed of 574.8 km/h (159.6 m/s, 357.2 mph), becoming the fastest conventional train and fastest train on a national rail system (as opposed to dedicated test track).

Route
The line passes through the French regions of Île-de-France and Grand Est. The first  section of this new route, linking Vaires-sur-Marne near Paris to Baudrecourt in the Moselle, opened on 10 June 2007. It is the first line in France to travel at this maximum speed in commercial service, the first in France to use ERTMS, the new European rail signalling system and the first line also served by German ICE trains. The second phase includes the  Saverne Tunnel.

History

Early proposals and planning

In 1969, Metz politician Raymond Mondon requested a study of a fast train from Paris to Strasbourg along the route of the planned A4 autoroute. In 1970–71, the International Union of Railways (UIC, based on its French acronym) developed a master plan of fast intercity connections in continental Europe. Its connection between Paris and Strasbourg was very similar to the route of the LGV Est. The UIC master plan called for this line to be constructed shortly after Paris-Lyon and Paris-Brussels lines. In 1974, the director of SNCF confirmed that the company wanted to follow the UIC master plan.

Germany, which was developing the Transrapid maglev system, was long reserved about the TGV system being developed by France. A 1975 study concluded that the passenger traffic to only Alsace and Lorraine would not be enough for the financial feasibility of the line. In 1982, recognizing German reluctance to extend the line into Germany, SNCF president André Chadeau announced that the company would not build the LGV Est without government subsidies. The following year, Saverne engineer Charles Maetz convinced MPs Adrien Zeller and François Grussenmeyer to establish the East European TGV Association, which managed to bring together local authorities to support the project.

The LGV Est is a direct result of a project begun in 1985 with the establishment of a working group chaired by Claude Rattier and later by Philippe Essig. Their report provided the basis for preliminary design studies conducted in 1992–93. The initial 1980s plan extended along a corridor from Paris to Munich. However, the expected passenger traffic along this corridor was quite low, unlike Paris-Lyon and Paris-Brussels/London corridors, and a direct route crossed a region of eastern France far from any major urban area.

In 1986, MP Marc Reymann submitted to the government a route that shared a common trunk line between the LGV Nord and LGV Est from Paris, through Charles de Gaulle Airport, to Soissons before forking into lines to Brussels (LGV Nord) and Strasbourg (LGV Est). In 1988, the German government agreed to a rail line from Paris to Frankfurt via Saarbrücken.

The following year, Philippe Essig presented the route that would later be built and at the same time addressed the other problem: financing. This route, further north than previous proposals, served Reims and Strasbourg. In order to avoid offending the cities of Nancy and Metz, which share an ancient rivalry, and avoid problems encountered during the construction of the A4 autoroute twenty years earlier, this route traveled directly to Strasbourg and passed midway between Nancy and Metz, where a single station would be built to serve both towns and improve relations between them.

Financing of this proposal called for contributions from local governments—a first in France for construction of a high-speed line—and the Grand Duchy of Luxembourg. This was a favorable financial arrangement for SNCF due to low ridership projections and because the population of the towns served were below a threshold for building a high-speed line. The complexity of financing resulted in the long delay of the project. Under the government of Pierre Bérégovoy (French Prime Minister from 1992 to 1993), the government refused to contribute more than 25 billion francs to the project, and limited the route to Baudrecourt, to which the Alsace region threatened to withdraw its financial contribution to the project. After long delays under the successive governments, all wanting to limit the cost of the project, a two-phase project was finally accepted by all parties, provided that commitments were made for the quick completion of the second phase.

Approval and launch of the project
On 1 April 1992, the project was added to the master plan of high-speed lines, in which it was classified as a priority project. On 22 May 1992, France and Germany agreed to a Franco-German high-speed line consisting of a northern branch through Saarbrücken and Mannheim and a southern branch through Strasbourg and Karlsruhe. The same year a similar memorandum of understanding was signed between the transport ministers of France and Luxembourg. At the European Council meeting in Essen in 1994, the LGV Est project was reaffirmed as a priority trans-European transport project.

The expected socio-economic benefits of the LGV project was lower than other ongoing high-speed rail projects: LGV Bretagne-Pays de la Loire and LGV Bordeaux–Toulouse. The line is redundant to three existing rail lines: Paris to Strasbourg, Paris to Mulhouse, and the combined  and  lines. Additionally, the international potential of the planned line seemed low, as Germany had little interest in the development of high-speed lines, favored domestic north–south axes, and due to the competition between SNCF and Deutsche Bahn.

The decision to build the line is politically motivated by fostering European integration, serving the European institutions in Strasbourg, and geographical balance of French high-speed rail lines, following the construction of high-speed lines from Paris to the southeast (LGV Sud-Est, LGV Rhône-Alpes, & LGV Méditerranée), the southwest (LGV Atlantique), and north (LGV Nord).

A public inquiry was conducted in 1994. The following year, a report conducted at the request of the Transport Minister advocated a complete redesign of the project, with an endpoint of the line at Épernay and from there onwards the adaptation of the existing Paris-Strasbourg line to accommodate high-speed tilting trains. In Nancy, which this route favored, this route was championed locally by Gérard Lignac, director of the L'Est Républicain newspaper. Although a budget was not completed and the planned phasing of the project was opposed by Lorraine and Alsace, the déclaration d'utilité publique was signed on 14 May 1996, two days before the deadline after which a new public inquiry would have been required.

A protocol for the construction and financing of the LGV Est was signed between the national government, RFF, SNCF, and local governments. The financing agreement for the first phase of the line from Vaires-sur-Marne to Baudrecourt was signed on 7 December 2000 between the numerous partners in the project, including 17 local governments. On 18 December 2003, the Jean-Pierre Raffarin government announced that it would proceed with several TGV projects, including construction of the second phase of the LGV Est, which would begin in 2010. On 24 January 2007, the financial arrangements for studies and preparatory work for the second phase of the line from Baudrecourt to Strasbourg was signed.

Construction
Construction of the line was divided into two phases. The first phase traverses  of relatively flat land from Vaires-sur-Marne ( east of Paris) to Baudrecourt (between Metz and Nancy), where it intersects the Metz–Saarbrücken and Paris-Strasbourg rail lines. Construction on the first phase began in 2002 and it entered into service on 10 June 2007. Until the completion of the second phase, TGV trains continued from here towards Strasbourg on the older (lower-speed) existing Paris-Strasbourg track. The second phase traversed  of rougher terrain from Baudrecourt to Vendenheim, on the northern edge of the Strasbourg metropolitan area. Construction on the second phase began in August 2010 and it opened on 3 July 2016.

Besides the construction of the LGV, the project includes:
 construction of three TGV stations:
Champagne-Ardenne TGV near Reims (Bezannes)
Meuse TGV (Trois-Domaines)
Lorraine TGV (in Louvigny, near Metz-Nancy-Lorraine Airport)
 upgrades and improvements to terminal lines and facilities, especially between the Gare de l'Est station in Paris and Vaires-sur-Marne and on the Strasbourg–Kehl main line.
 modernisation of city centre stations
 electrification of lines through the Vosges valleys to permit seamless TGV running

Journey times have decreased as follows:

Phase one
Earthworks for the first phase between Vaires-sur-Marne and Baudrecourt started in spring 2002. The contractors took three years to complete the earthworks and some 327 pieces of structural work as well as re-establishing communications for people and wildlife. Tracklaying and building the new stations started in 2004.

As the first infrastructure project of its kind to be declared a public utility by the Ministry of the Environment, the LGV Est is also the first railway to be financed largely by the French regions and the European Union (EU). The main contractor for the project is RFF (Réseau ferré de France), the state-owned company responsible for managing the French rail infrastructure.

Civil engineering works were distributed in eight contracts which were awarded after bidding by five companies: SNCF, ISL, Tractebel, Scétauroute and Setec. This is the first time there has been competition for the construction of a TGV line since reform of the rail system in 1997 and the involvement of RFF. SNCF Engineering, in partnership with EEG Simecsol succeeded in obtaining four of the contracts (including one for the second phase), this being 50% of the civil engineering project. Moreover, it directed the entire superstructure works project (track, signals and electrification) under the responsibility of Réseau Ferré de France.

On 9 June 2007, the TGV Est made its inaugural voyage, leaving from the Gare de l'Est at 7:36am. Notable passengers included: François Fillon, the French Prime Minister, Alain Juppé, the Minister of Sustainable Development, and the Argentinian Ambassador to France. The Prime Minister hailed this event as "a beautiful symbol of the capacity of our country to innovate when it is united, a symbol of European France, of the knowledge of French businesses, and a symbol that gives confidence in the future." He hailed this achievement as "a union by train between France and its German, Luxembourgish, and Swiss partners, between the European institutions and the [French] capital."

Phase two
On 2 September 2009, infrastructure manager RFF announced the tendering for the second phase. Financing was finalized on 1 September 2009, with a mix of sources ranging from the French and Luxembourgish governments, regional governments, the EU, and RFF.
The full line was planned to open on 3 April 2016, but that opening was delayed to 3 July by a major accident during testing of the line. Until then, TGV ran between these two cities via the existing Metz-Strasbourg line at the  normal speed for the line.

The final weld of rails on the second phase took place on 31 March 2015 and was accompanied by a ceremony marking the end of construction of Phase 2, although work on signaling continued. The opening of the second phase had been scheduled for 3 April 2016, but was delayed after a train derailed near Eckwersheim during commissioning trials, resulting in 11 deaths and damage to a bridge on the line. The line opened on 3 July 2016. A landslide in March 2020 caused a derailment, with 22 minor injuries, and one serious.

World speed record

A series of high speed trials, named Operation V150, were conducted on the LGV Est prior to its June 2007 opening using a specially modified train. The trials were conducted jointly by SNCF, TGV builder Alstom, and LGV Est owner Réseau Ferré de France between 15 January 2007 and 15 April 2007. Following a series of increasingly high speed runs, the official speed record attempt took place on 3 April 2007. The top speed of 574.8 km/h (159.6 m/s, 357.2 mph) was reached at kilometre point 191 near the village of Le Chemin, between the Meuse and Champagne-Ardenne TGV stations, where the most favourable profile exists.

Construction financing
The total cost was about €4 billion, apportioned as follows:
 61% public funds
French government
17 local authorities
European Union
Luxembourg
17% RFF
22% SNCF (including €800 million for TGV rolling stock)

Controversy
The LGV Est was a subject of public debate for several reasons:
 The 2006 commencement of first phase service was pushed back to 10 June 2007.
 This was the first LGV construction in which local communities had to contribute to the funding together with the state government and European Union. The contribution was fixed following a capital structure group discussion of the communities, depending on the time decrease for users in relation to the Île de France. Alsace has therefore had to pay almost €300 million. This financial model continued for the second phase, and is used for other new LGV lines as well.

Timeline

 22 May 1992: French-German La Rochelle summit; commitment by France and Germany to create a high-speed rail line linking the two countries, comprising a northern branch via Saarbrücken-Mannheim and a southern branch via Strasbourg-Karlsruhe
 14 May 1996: declaration of public utility
 28 January 2002: official beginning of works for first phase between Vaires-sur-Marne and Baudrecourt
 18 December 2003: government of Jean-Pierre Raffarin announces approximately 50 improvement projects, of which eight are for the TGV, including second phase works due to begin about 2010; additionally, connection of TGV Est with ICE to occur between 2007 and 2010
 19 October 2004: laying of the first LGV Est rail at Saint-Hilaire-au-Temple (Marne) by the transport minister, Gilles de Robien; earthworks are 80% complete and of the 338 structural projects, 290 (of which 14 are viaducts) are complete
 June 2006: the catenary between Marne and Meuse is powered
 31 October 2006: the catenary for the entire length of the line is powered to enable testing
 13 November 2006: beginning of technical testing of the central 210 km of the line using specialized trains to check correct track geometry, etc., at speeds up to 
25 January 2007: An initial budget of €94 million is allocated to the second phase of the line between Baudrecourt and Strasbourg
30 January 2007: The power is on over the whole length of 300 km.
1 February 2007: The control centre at Pagny-sur-Moselle is opened.
13 February 2007: A new world record for train speed is unofficially set by a TGV during tests on the LGV Est.
9 June 2007: The inaugural voyage of the LGV Est is completed (see below).
10 June 2007: The LGV Est opens for commercial service.
16 May 2008: First Stop of ICE-MF due to a transformer fire on this route.
29 October 2009: the European Commission announced that LGV Est's second phase has been awarded €76M, out of total costs of €633.3M. The Commission stated the funding had been brought forward to accelerate construction due to the economic crisis.
June 2010: Construction begins on phase 2
10 November 2011 – 19 June 2012: First bore of the Saverne Tunnel bored.
26 September 2012 – 25 February 2013: Second bore of the Saverne Tunnel bored.
31 March 2015: Final weld of rails on second phase marking the end of construction of the second phase.
14 November 2015: A TGV derailed in the commune of Eckwersheim during testing on the then-unopened second phase, killing at least ten people
3 July 2016: Opening of the second phase, delayed by 3 months by the accident.

Accidents
On 16 May 2008, a car of an ICE 3MF at Annet-sur-Marne caught fire. The train, with around 300 passengers, had to be evacuated after a transformer had caught fire. The cause is suspected to be a defective drive motor, from which parts had come loose and damaged the transformer.

On 12 June 2008, a "short turnaround" of an ICE coming from Paris, which was to return from the St. Ingbert in Saarland to Paris, resulted in several slightly injured travelers. All passengers should change at this small station into a substitute IC arrived from Frankfurt; its passengers, on the other hand, should transfer to the turning ICE. As a result of several faulty ICE units, some intermittent ICE journeys completely failed or were replaced by TGV trains in the same week; On 13 June 2008, the DB then restricted the continuous traffic on the POS Northast for the time being from five to three connections. The remaining rides were broken: TGV operated Paris-Saarbrücken and back; IC Saarbrücken-Frankfurt and back. Only two of the six existing ICE trainsets were needed. From 19 June 2008, the trains went through again, but some courses were still served by TGV. These can not turn in Mannheim and must drive over Käfertal, which leads to small delays.
On the afternoon of 8 July 2008, ICE 9555 Paris-Frankfurt collided in the area of the Kennelgarten station near Kaiserslautern with a truck that had been stuck in the gravel while turning in a construction site. The approximately 400 passengers of the ICE remained unhurt, but six of the eight cars of the ICE were damaged. The train could later continue with its own strength to Kaiserslautern, where the passengers had to change to a replacement train.
In July 2008, there were again numerous ICE failures; from 21 July – 23 August 2008, TGV units regularly helped with one full-round journey. Nevertheless, passengers often had to change trains in or from Saarbrücken, Homburg / Saar or Forbach (F) to or from TGV trains, or in some cases were not carried as a result of a lack of vehicles. Also in the course of autumn and in the winter of 2008/2009 the ICE disturbances continued; there were always TGV replacement services and / or breaking the connection in Saarbrücken Hbf.
On 14 November 2015, the TGV accident in Eckwersheim caused the most severe accident with a TGV. During a test drive a train derailed due to excessive speed in a curve and partially crashed into the Rhine-Marne Canal. 11 people died, 42 others were injured, 12 of them seriously.

See also

 TGV
 High-speed rail in France
 Intercity Express

References

External links

LGV Est : key project steps & construction progress
LGV Est webpage
 LGV Est Tests and preparations
 Site for the grand opening on 15 March
 Interior design proposal, Christian Lacroix's having been adopted
 Special search engine
LGV Est Information and Pictures
 A website for the 11 victims of the LGV Est derailment, detailed information about the investigations

Est
Railway lines opened in 2007
Railway lines in Grand Est